Jhulan Nishit Goswami (born 25 November 1982) is an Indian former cricketer. She played for Indian women's cricket team from 2002 to 2022.

She played as a right-arm medium fast bowler and right-handed batter. She is one of the fastest (female) bowler of all times and considered one of the greatest bowlers to ever play the sport.  She played 204 ODI matches before her retirement from international cricket in 2022, taking 255 wickets, and holds the record for taking the most number of wickets in Women's One Day International cricket.

Goswami won the ICC Women's Player of the Year award in 2007 and the M.A. Chidambaram trophy for Best Women's Cricketer in 2011. She rose to number one in the ICC Women's ODI bowling rankings in January 2016.

Career
Goswami was born to a middle-class family in the town of Chakdaha in the Nadia district of West Bengal on 25 November 1982. She took up cricket at the age of 15, and was previously a football fan.  Goswami began to take interest in cricket when she watched the 1992 Cricket World Cup on TV. She took further interest in the sport after watching Australian batter Belinda Clark in the 1997 Women’s Cricket World Cup. As Chakdaha did not have any cricket facilities at the time, Goswami travelled to Kolkata to play cricket.

Soon after finishing her training in Kolkata, Goswami was called up to the Bengal women's cricket team. At the age of 19, she made her international debut in 2002 in a one-day International Match against England in Chennai. Her Test debut came on 14 January 2002 against England in Lucknow.

Goswami along with Mithali Raj guided Indian Women’s Cricket team to first Test series win in England in 2006–07 season. During the same season, Goswami helped Indian Women Cricket team to get their first victory against England, making a fifty as nightwatchman in the first Test at Leicester and taking her career best match figures of 10 for 78–5 for 33 and 5 for 45 – in the second test at Taunton. In 2007 Jhulan was a member of Asian squad in the Afro-Asia tournament in India and also won the ICC Women’s Cricketer of the Year (when no Indian male cricketer bagged an individual award).

Later in 2008, she took over the captaincy from Mithali Raj and held till 2011. In 2008, she also became the fourth woman to reach 100 wickets in ODIs at Asia Cup. She led India in 25 ODIs. In 2010 she was awarded the Arjun Award and in 2012 she became second Indian women cricketer to receive Padma Shri after Diana Edulji.

She has 40 Test wickets in her name in 10 matches. Overall she has 271 international wickets in 223 games and has scored 1593 runs with three 50s. She is the highest wicket taker in WODIs going past Australian Cathryn Fitzpatrick record of 180 wickets. She achieved the feat during the Women’s Quadrangular Series in South Africa. On 7 February 2018 Jhulan became the first woman cricketer to reach 200 wickets in one day cricket. She has 200 wickets in 166 matches at an average of 21.76 with two 5 wickets and 4 four wickets hauls. In ODIs she has 995 runs in 166 matches. In 2011 where India failed to win, she took 6 for 31 against New Zealand.

In May 2017, Goswami became the leading wicket-taker in ODIs when she took her 181st wicket against South Africa at PUK Oval, Potchefstroom, surpassing Australia's Cathryn Fitzpatrick.

Goswami was part of the Indian team to reach the final of the 2017 Women's Cricket World Cup where the team lost to England by nine runs.

Jhulan Goswami said on 19 September 2017 that a biopic on her is in the making with the working title Chakdaha Express. The biopic will be directed by Sushanta Das, it will trace Goswami's journey from the Vivekananda Park nets in Kolkata to the Lord's cricket ground in London, where India lost the World Cup final against England in July.

In February 2018, she became the first bowler to take 200 wickets in WODIs. In April 2018, an Indian postage stamp was issued in her honour. In March 2022, in the 2022 Women's Cricket World Cup, Goswami became the first bowler to take 250 wickets in WODI cricket.

In September 2018, against Sri Lanka, she took her 300th wicket in international cricket. In November 2020, Goswami  was nominated for the ICC Women's ODI Cricketer of the Decade award.

In May 2021, she was named in India's Test squad for their one-off match against the England women's cricket team. In January 2022, she was named in India's team for the 2022 Women's Cricket World Cup in New Zealand.

On 12 March 2022, she became the highest wicket taker in Women's World Cup overtaking previous record of Lyn Fullston.

Goswami retired from international cricket in September 2022, with her final match coming against England at Lord's, with India winning by 16 runs. She will continue to be in the Bengal squad as a mentor/player.

Coaching career
On 2 February 2023, she joined the Mumbai-based Women's Premier League franchise Mumbai Indians as a bowling coach and mentor.

Awards, honors and titles

 2007 – ICC Women's Cricketer of the Year
 Captain of Indian Women's Cricket Team (2008–2011)
 Fastest Bowler
 2010 – Arjuna Award
 2012 – Padma Shri
 Leading International Wicket Taker

Legacy
 Chakda Xpress the biopic of Jhulan Goswami, directed by Prosit Roy, starring  Anushka Sharma will be premiered on Netflix. By this she is the second Indian female cricketer to have a biopic to her credit following Mithali Raj.  (Taapsee Pannu portrayed her in 2022 film Shabaash Mithu, a biopic on Mithali Raj.)

References

External links

 
 

1983 births
Living people
Bengal women cricketers
East Zone women cricketers
India women One Day International cricketers
India women Test cricketers
India women Twenty20 International cricketers
Indian women cricket captains
Indian women cricketers
Recipients of the Arjuna Award
Recipients of the Padma Shri in sports
People from Nadia district
Cricketers from West Bengal
Sportswomen from West Bengal
IPL Trailblazers cricketers
International Cricket Council Cricketer of the Year